Rory Mone (born 1977) is a Gaelic footballer who plays for Clontibret O'Neills. He played at senior level for Monaghan's minors, under-21s and seniors then off he went out to Chicago. He would be a brother of John Paul and John Paul is a brother of Dessie.

References

1977 births
Living people
Irish expatriate sportspeople in the United States
Monaghan inter-county Gaelic footballers